is a railway station located in the city of  Takamatsu, Kagawa, Japan. It is operated by the private transportation company Takamatsu-Kotohira Electric Railroad (Kotoden) and has station designations "K02", "N02" and "S00".

Lines
Kawaramachi Station is served by the Kotoden Kotohira Line, Kotoden Nagao Line, and Kotoden Shido Line. It is located 32.9 km from the opposing terminus of the Kotohira line at Kotoden-Kotohira Station.

Layout
The station is an elevated station integrated with the Kotoden Kawaramachi Building completed in 1996, and the Kotohira Line and Nagao Line platforms are located on the first floor of the building. The Kotohira Line has one island platform and two tracks (platforms 1 and 2), and the Nagao Line has one side platform and one track (platform 3). The Nagao Line joins the Kotohira Line on the Kataharamachi side. Also, on the Hanazono side, there are siding tracks with effective lengths of 6 cars and 4 cars. The Shido Line has two tracks (platforms 4 and 5) on one side of the deadheaded platform across the road in the northeastern part of the building, and only platform 4 is used for trains arriving and departing during non-rush hours. The tracks are not connected to the Kotohira and Nagao lines. The Kotohira Line/Nagao Line platform is connected by a connecting walkway on the second floor above ground. There are two ticket gates, one on the second floor of the station building and the other on the ground floor at the end of the Shido Line platform. All lines can be used from both ticket gates.

Platforms

Adjacent stations

History
Kawaramachi Station opened on 22 April 1915.

Surrounding area
Takamatsu Central Shopping Street
Jobancho Shopping Street
Minamishinmachi Shopping Street
Takamatsu City Hall

See also
 List of railway stations in Japan

References

External links

Official timetable 
Kawaramachi Station  

Railway stations in Japan opened in 1915
Railway stations in Takamatsu
Stations of Takamatsu-Kotohira Electric Railroad